Podolskaya is a rural locality (a village) in Terebayevskoye Rural Settlement, Nikolsky District, Vologda Oblast, Russia. The population was 27 as of 2002.

Geography 
Podolskaya is located 33 km northwest of Nikolsk (the district's administrative centre) by road. Chelpanovo is the nearest rural locality.

References 

Rural localities in Nikolsky District, Vologda Oblast